Ivar Tingdahl (21 December 1893 – 9 February 1962) was a Swedish male foil and sabre fencer. He competed at the 1928 and 1936 Summer Olympics.

References

External links
 

1893 births
1962 deaths
Swedish male foil fencers
Swedish male sabre fencers
Olympic fencers of Sweden
Fencers at the 1928 Summer Olympics
Fencers at the 1936 Summer Olympics
People from Tanum Municipality
Sportspeople from Västra Götaland County